Kathryn Christine Imrie (born Kathryn Marshall 8 June 1967) is a Scottish professional golfer who played on the U.S.-based LPGA Tour and the Ladies European Tour.

Amateur career
Marshall was born in Dundee, Scotland. She had a successful amateur career. She was the 1981 and 1985 Scottish Schools' champion, 1983-85 Scottish Youth's champion, the 1983 Scottish Girls champion, and the Scottish Junior Open Strokeplay Champion 1985, 1986, 1987. She was a member of the 1990 Curtis Cup team. She played her collegiate golf at the University of Arizona where she was 1989 All-American.

Professional career
Marshall turned professional in 1990. She played on the Ladies European Tour from 1991 to 2008 and the LPGA Tour from 1993 to 2006. She won one LPGA event, the 1995 Jamie Farr Toledo Classic. She played on the 1996 European team in the Solheim Cup.

Professional wins

LPGA Tour wins (1)

Team appearances
Amateur
European Lady Junior's Team Championship (representing Scotland): 1988
European Ladies' Team Championship (representing Scotland): 1987, 1989
Vagliano Trophy (representing Great Britain & Ireland): 1989 (winners)
Curtis Cup (representing Great Britain & Ireland): 1990

Professional
Solheim Cup (representing Europe): 1996

References

External links

Scottish female golfers
Ladies European Tour golfers
LPGA Tour golfers
Solheim Cup competitors for Europe
Sportspeople from Dundee
1967 births
Living people